Bearcroft is a surname. Notable people with the surname include:

 Edward Bearcroft (1737–1796), English barrister, judge and politician
 John Edward Bearcroft (1851–1931), British Royal Navy officer
 Philip Bearcroft (1695–1761), English clergyman and antiquary